Shimane Susanoo Magic (島根スサノオマジック) is a Japanese professional basketball team in Japan's top-tier basketball competition, the B.League. The team is based in Shimane Prefecture with its home arena in Matsue City, but with a focus on playing games in the entire region.

The head coach was Željko Pavličević who coached Japan at the World Championships in 2006. He was appointed in May 2010.

Introduction
The club became a member of the bj league in 2010, becoming the first professional basketball team in the Sanin region to compete in top-tier competition, and second of any professional sports team after Gainare Tottori.

The team's name comes from the mythical legend of early Izumo (the story of Susanoo slaying the Yamata no Orochi), and the English word magic, representing the imagery of the myths of the region as well as the team itself.
The team colours are blue, black and silver which also represent the Shimane prefecture. The blue evokes images of Lake Shinji and the Sea of Japan, silver represents the historic Iwami Ginzan Silver Mine and black represents the black pine forests found throughout the region. The team logo is a combination of clouds and an Orochi-like dragon holding a basketball, expressing a sense of strength and speed.

History
Basketball has long been a popular sport among young people in the Matsue area with the organisation of Mini Basketball (a basketball competition played by elementary school children) becoming popular in Matsue. Historically, Matsue area has had success in athletic meets, Matsue Technical High School winning at interscholastic athletic meets in 1960 and 1968. Both Japan men's and women's basketball have had strong performing players from Matsue region, the region being known as the "Kingdom of Basketball"
After an unsuccessful attempt for application to join the bj league in 2007, in August 2009 it was officially announced that Shimane would have a team in the bj league becoming in the 2010/11 season. In November 2009, the decision was made by the public for the team name to be Shimane Susanoo Magic. University students born in Matsue were invited to decide upon the team's proposed logo and proposed designs for the team mascot were received from all over the country. The winning proposal was "Susatama-kun"

Roster

Notable players

Coaches
Željko Pavličević (2010–13)
Vlaikidis Vlasios (2013–14)
Reggie Hanson (2014)
Tomohiro Moriyama
Michael Katsuhisa (2015–17)
Yukinori Suzuki
Paul Henare

Arenas
Matsue City General Gymnasium
Kashima General Gymnasium
Kami Arena
Yonago Industrial Gymnasium

Performance

External links

References

 
Basketball teams in Japan
Basketball teams established in 2009
2009 establishments in Japan